Catel Muller (born August 27, 1964), who publishes under the name Catel, is a French comic book artist and illustrator.

Life

In 2015, she published a graphic novel based on the life of actor Mylène Demongeot, Adieu Kharkov.

Selected work 
 Lucie s'en soucie, graphic novel (2000), with Véronique Grisseaux
 Le Sang des Valentines, graphic novel (2004), with Christian De Metter, received an Angoulême International Comics Festival Prize
 Olympe de Gouges, graphic novel (2012), with José-Louis Bocquet, received the Grand Prix littéraire de l'Héroïne Madame Figaro

References 

1964 births
Living people
French graphic novelists
French illustrators
French comics artists
French female comics artists
Artists from Strasbourg
Female comics writers